Amir Alagić (born 5 March 1960) is a Bosnian-Australian professional football manager. He is most recently the manager and the head coach of the Sri Lanka national team.

Managerial career
Alagić started his coaching career in 1996 and managed clubs in Europe and Asia. He also managed Bosnia and Herzegovina U19. In 2004, he was appointed head coach of Bruneian club DPMM FC and won the domestic double there, instigating a stint with the country's national football team a year later. In 2020, he was appointed as the manager of Sri Lanka national team. He resigned as coach of Sri Lanka after the 2023 AFC Asian Cup qualification, as Sri Lanka, rated as the weakest team in the group, were eliminated without scoring a point and only two goals.

References

External links

1960 births
Living people
Australian soccer coaches
Bosnia and Herzegovina football managers
Bosnia and Herzegovina emigrants to Australia
DPMM FC managers
Brunei national football team managers
Expatriate football managers in Brunei
Al-Riyadh SC managers
FC Drita managers
South China AA managers
Sri Lanka national football team managers
Australian expatriate soccer coaches
Bosnia and Herzegovina expatriate football managers
Bosnia and Herzegovina expatriate sportspeople in Australia
Bosnia and Herzegovina expatriate sportspeople in Brunei
NK Jedinstvo Bihać managers
Association football coaches